The Women's FIH Hockey World Cup is the field hockey World Cup competition for women, whose format for qualification and the final tournament is similar to the men's. It has been held since 1974. The tournament has been organized by the International Hockey Federation (FIH) since they merged with the International Federation of Women's Hockey Associations (IFWHA) in 1982. Since 1986, it has been held regularly once every four years, in the same year as the men's competition, which is mid-cycle between Summer Olympic games.

Of the fourteen tournaments held so far, only four teams have won the event. Netherlands is by far the most successful team, having won the title nine times. Argentina, Germany and Australia are joint second best teams, having each won the title twice. So far, the Netherlands and Australia are the two champions able to defend their titles. At the end of the 2018 World Cup, fifteen nations had reached the semifinal of the tournament.

The size of the tournament has changed over time. The 1974 and 1978 World Cups featured 10 nations (smallest); the 1976 World Cup featured 11 nations; the 2002 World Cup featured 16 nations (largest), and the remaining seven World Cups have featured 12 nations. The World Cup was again expanded to 16 teams in 2018, and the FIH will evaluate the possibility of increasing it to 24 in 2022.

The 2022 tournament was held in Amstelveen and Terrassa from 1st to 17th July, with Netherlands winning a third consecutive title and a record ninth title after beating Argentina 3–1 in the final.

Results

Summaries

Successful national teams

* = host country
^ = includes results representing West Germany between 1974 and 1990
# = states that have since split into two or more independent countries

Performance by continental zones

Team appearances

^ = includes results representing West Germany between 1974 and 1990
# = states that have since split into two or more independent nations

Debut of teams

* = Defunct Team
# = Part of Soviet Union (1974–1990)
^ = Germany is official successor of West Germany

Argentina, Germany and the Netherlands are the only teams to have competed at each World Cup; 28 teams have competed in at least one World Cup.

See also
Field hockey at the Summer Olympics
Women's IFWHA World Conference
Men's FIH Hockey World Cup
Women's FIH Hockey Junior World Cup
Women's FIH Pro League

References

External links
 

 

Hockey World Cup
field
World Cup
Recurring sporting events established in 1974
Quadrennial sporting events